The Arkansas Arboretum is a  arboretum within Pinnacle Mountain State Park in Little Rock, Arkansas, United States. Situated below Pinnacle Mountain along the Little Maumelle River, the arboretum's flora and tree plantings correspond to Arkansas's six geographical regions, ranging from the flat-topped hills and steep valleys of the Ozark Plateau to the flat bottomland and tallgrass prairies of the Mississippi alluvial plain, with a  paved interpretive trail.

See also
 List of botanical gardens in the United States

References

External links
 www.arkansasstateparks.com: Arkansas Trail in the Arkansas Arboretum Information

Arboreta in Arkansas
Botanical gardens in Arkansas
Geography of Little Rock, Arkansas
Protected areas of Pulaski County, Arkansas
Tourist attractions in Little Rock, Arkansas
Woodland gardens